Artificial waves are human-made waves usually created on a specially designed surface or in a pool.

Making waves 

Surface waves can be created by any moving object displacing fluid: turbine blades, paddles, a hand, a flung stone, etc. Each pulse of water (or crest) pushed outward from the disturbance leaves a space (or trough) behind it which causes another, smaller pulse to follow: thus a thrown stone's single impact causes a series of ripples. Larger waves can be built up if a series of movements are timed to reinforce waves' motion, much like a person sliding back and forth in a bathtub. Boundaries and obstacles also shape waves by concentrating or dissipating some of the wave's energy.

When fluid flows over a surface which diverts it upward, this flow can rise above the rest of the fluid in a standing wave which remains in one place while the flow lasts. An example of a natural standing wave may be found in swift-flowing streams, downstream from a boulder in the stream bed.

Artificial reefs can also be placed into natural wave environments to enhance the quality of the incoming breaking wave for surfing. Wave focusing areas can build up wave power and height prior to breaking, and breaking surfaces then trip the wave up to make it break; the surfing surface then carries the breaking wave along an angle that maximises its value for surfing.

Applications 
In a wave pool water is pushed out of an opening with enough force to create a wave-like shape. Riders can ride this type of wave on a regular surfboard.

Wave pools go as far back as the 19th Century, as famous fantasy castle builder King Ludwig of Bavaria electrified a lake to create breaking waves. In 1929, a Pathe Pictorial there is film of "Indoor Surfers" frolicking in small, artificially-generated waves in a swimming pool in Munich, Germany.

The waves were created by agitators which pushed waves through the diving area and into a shallow area - where kids were bodysurfing little waves: "This is the new kind of swimming bath that is becoming the rage of Germany," one of the captions reads. "No more placid waters for bathers - the mechanism behind the netting keeps everything moving."

In 1939, a public swimming pool in Wembley, England was equipped with machines that created wavelets. Not for riding, but to approximate the soothing ebb and flowing motion of the ocean.

Artificial waves created on a designed surface, by water shot over the surface at a high speed to create a wave, are ridden with a short board about the length of a wakeboard. With wakesurfing, which is derived from wakeboarding, it is possible to surf a wave created by a boat without being strapped on to the board and without being towed by a rope. With wakeboarding, the rider is strapped on to the board to prevent the board from flying out under the rider's feet and the rider is towed by a rope without surfing a wave.

The "standing wave" or "sheet wave" type of artificial wave was developed in the 1980s by American real estate attorney Tom Lochtefeld who was a partner in the development of Raging Waters water parks in San Dimas, San Jose and Salt Lake City.

A surfer from La Jolla, Lochtefeld had a vision of creating water park attractions that were as exciting as riding waves in the ocean, and in 1988 he patented "A wave-forming generator for generating inclined surfaces on a contained body of water."

The untechnical, proprietary term is "sheet wave." Rather than pulse a rapidly deteriorating wave of energy through big pools of water, Lochtefeld’s "new wave" flowed water over a stationary surface - in an enclosed, transportable area measured in square feet, not acre feet.

The first Wave Loch FlowRider opened at the Schlitterbahn, in Texas in 1991. In 1993, Lochtefeld built a larger, curling FlowBarrel sheet wave at the Summerland resort in Bo, Norway.

The first barreling wave pool ever open to the public was developed by Lochtefeld’s Wave House restaurant and music lifestyle centers. The first Wave House opened in Durban, South Africa in 2001, and followed by San Diego, CA (2005), Santiago Chile (2008), and Singapore (2009).

WaveLoch company has sold hundreds of FlowRider sheet wave machines around the world - from water parks to Royal Caribbean cruise ships.

Dr Peter Killen was the first to develop a continuously breaking, oblique, stationary wave for the study of wave riding. The work was published in the Journal of Fluid Mechanics in 1976.

See also
Artificial wave pool
Wavegarden

Water waves
Water sports